The New Zealand Antarctic Medal was created 1 September 2006, as a New Zealand royal honour to replace the British Polar Medal.

History
The Polar Medal was instituted in 1904 and awarded to those who had made notable contributions to the exploration and knowledge of polar regions and who, in doing so, had undergone the hazards and rigors imposed by the polar environment to life and movement, whether by land, sea or air.

In 1995, the Prime Minister’s Honours Advisory Committee recommended that the Polar Medal should be created under a New Zealand royal warrant. It also recommended that it should be renamed as “The Antarctic Medal” to reflect the fact that it is in relation to Antarctica that New Zealand’s endeavors and achievements have been made. The New Zealand Antarctic Medal was formally instituted by Queen Elizabeth II on 1 September 2006.

Eligibility

The New Zealand Antarctic Medal may be awarded to those New Zealanders and other persons who either individually or as members of a New Zealand mission in the Antarctic region have made an outstanding contribution to exploration, scientific research, conservation, environmental protection, or knowledge of the Antarctic region; or in support of New Zealand’s objectives or operations, or both, in the Antarctic region. The Medal will not be awarded for acts of bravery, for short-term acts of extreme endurance, for long service or for service in Antarctica generally.

Recipients
, 17 awards and one honorary award have been issued. All recipients are entitled to the post-nominal letters NZAM.

See also
 New Zealand Honours System
 Polar Medal

Notes

References
 Beehive New Zealand Antarctic Medal
 New Zealand Defence Force Archived Medal News 2006

 
Civil awards and decorations of New Zealand
New Zealand and the Antarctic